Kopys is an urban-type settlement in Orsha Raion, Vitebsk Region, Belarus.

History

The first references to Kopys are dated at 1059. From the 14th century, it was part of the Grand Duchy of Lithuania and subsequently the Polish–Lithuanian Union after the Union of Krewo (1385). Administratively, it was part of the Vitebsk Voivodeship. It was granted town rights in the 16th century. It was a private town owned by the Ostrogski family and, after 1594, the Radziwiłł family. A castle stood in the town of Kopys and a Calvinist church was founded by Krzysztof Mikołaj Radziwiłł. During the Great Northern War, in 1707, Kopys was destroyed by Russian troops. In 1772, it became a part of the Russian Empire in the course of the First Partition of Poland.

The Kapust Hasidic dynasty originates in Kopys. By the end of the 18th century, there was a Jewish typography in the town.

Notable Natives & Residents
 Alexander Lukashenko, president of Belarus
 David Remez, Israeli politician
 Veniamin Blazhenny, poet

References

External links
 Kopys at radzima.org
 Flag of Kopys (2004)
 Coats of Arms of Kopys
 The murder of the Jews of Kopys during World War II, at Yad Vashem website
 

Populated places in Vitebsk Region
Urban-type settlements in Belarus
Orsha District
Polochans
Vitebsk Voivodeship
Goretsky Uyezd
Holocaust locations in Belarus